The Peachland fire was a large wildfire in 2012 in British Columbia.

The Peachland fire started at around 3:00 pm, September 9, 2012, near the Okanagan connector behind the community of Trepanier on the east side of Peachland. 

Strong winds, high temperatures, low humidity and extremely dry conditions caused the Peachland fire to grow quickly. By around 7:00 pm, it had reached 200 hectares and burned a path towards Okanagan Lake. At least 1,550 residents were evacuated from the fire zone; four houses and three outbuildings were destroyed.  

Seventy firefighters, 17 structural fire protection units and six helicopters fought the Peachland fire at its peak. Light rainfall and cooler temperatures helped bring the fire under control on September 10th.

External links 

 http://www.peachland.ca/cms.asp?wpID=363
 http://bcwildfire.ca/hprScripts/WildfireNews/OneFire.asp?ID=464
 http://www.castanet.net/news/Peachland-Fire/80298/Some-homes-lost-in-Peachland-fire

2012 disasters in Canada
2012 09 09
Natural disasters in British Columbia
2012 wildfires
September 2012 events in Canada